Bryson Independent School District is a public school district based in Bryson, Texas (USA).

Located in Jack County, a small portion of the district extends into Young County.

Bryson ISD has one school that serves students in grades pre-kindergarten through twelve.

Academic achievement
In 2009, the school district was rated "academically acceptable" by the Texas Education Agency.

Special programs

Athletics
Bryson High School plays six-man football.

See also

List of school districts in Texas

References

External links
Bryson ISD

School districts in Jack County, Texas
School districts in Young County, Texas